Leiocephalus psammodromus, commonly known as the Turks & Caicos curlytail or Bastion Cay curlytail lizard , is a species of lizard in the family Leiocephalidae (curly-tailed lizard). It is native to Turks and Caicos Islands in the Caribbean Sea. The species was assessed as vulnerable by the IUCN in 2015 due to a sharply declining population threatened by habitat loss and invasive species. 2008 surveys on South Caicos, Salt Cay, Cotton Cay, or Grand Turk, did not report any individual of this species, as a result it is considered potentially extinct on these islands.

References

Leiocephalus
Reptiles described in 1920
Taxa named by Thomas Barbour